Southern Petrochemical Industries Corporation Ltd, or SPIC, is an Indian company that makes petrochemicals. The company, headquartered in Chennai, Tamil Nadu, India, was incorporated on 18 December 1969 and became a joint venture between the M. A. Chidambaram Group and TIDCO (a part of the Government of Tamil Nadu) in 1975. The government sold its stake in 1992. Its core competency is in fertiliser products. It has operations in power, oil and natural gas, pharmaceuticals, and biotechnology applications in agriculture.

The company's biggest client has been the government of Tamil Nadu, which purchases agro-products for subsidised distribution through its Public Distribution System. The company has been in poor financial health since about 2002. Its 2006 sales amounted to  2,200 crore, with a net operating loss of  180 crore.

SPIC has four business lines:
 the fertiliser division, 
 the pharmaceuticals division which manufactures Penicillin-G Potassium (fermentation-based), and active pharmaceutical ingredients, 
 the engineering/construction services division offers specialised and turnkey project-based solutions mainly in fertilisers, 
 the agri-business division, which offers products for agricultural development like hybrid seeds and  bio-fertilisers.

The company has a strategic stake/or has promoted companies like Thoothukudi Alkali Chemicals, a soda ash manufacturer, Tamil Nadu Petro-products a company which produces liner alkali benzene, Manali Petrochemicals, Indo-Jordan Chemicals and a host of other companies.

As per regulatory filings, the promoters (including TN government's investment arm which has 8.2% stake) hold 39.2%, institutions hold 16.2%, public shareholding is 29% and custodians of GDRs hold the balance. First, SPIC knocked on the BIFR doors, and then entered the CDR Cell for restructuring loans. The problem for SPIC started in the late 1990s when the company had planned a foray into petrochemicals through SPIC Petrochemicals, which ran into a rough weather. It was contrived then to make purified terephthalic acid (PTA) and polyester filament yarn (PFY) facility at Manali in Chennai.

References

External links
ONGC examining acquiring SPIC
Article from Times of India

Fertilizer companies of India
Companies based in Chennai
Petrochemical companies of India
1969 establishments in Tamil Nadu
Manufacturing companies established in 1969
Companies listed on the National Stock Exchange of India
Companies listed on the Bombay Stock Exchange